Acmadenia is a genus of flowering plants in the family Rutaceae. The species are mostly from the western Cape Province of South Africa, including:

Acmadenia alternifolia Cham.
Acmadenia argillophila I.Williams
Acmadenia baileyensis I.Williams
Acmadenia bodkinii (Schltr.) Strid
Acmadenia burchellii Dümmer
Acmadenia candida I.Williams
Acmadenia densifolia Sond.
Acmadenia faucitincta I.Williams
Acmadenia flaccida Eckl. & Zeyh.
Acmadenia fruticosa I.Williams
Acmadenia gracilis Dümmer
Acmadenia heterophylla P.E.Glover
Acmadenia kiwanensis I.Williams
Acmadenia latifolia I.Williams
Acmadenia laxa I.Williams
Acmadenia macradenia (Sond.) Dümmer
Acmadenia macropetala (P.E.Glover) Compton
Acmadenia maculata I.Williams
Acmadenia matroosbergensis E.Phillips
Acmadenia mundiana Eckl. & Zeyh.
Acmadenia nivea I.Williams
Acmadenia nivenii Sond.
Acmadenia obtusata (Thunb.) Bartl. & H.L.Wendl.
Acmadenia patentifolia I.Williams
Acmadenia rourkeana I.Williams
Acmadenia rupicola I.Williams
Acmadenia sheilae I.Williams
Acmadenia tenax I.Williams
Acmadenia teretifolia (Link) E.Phillips
Acmadenia tetracarpellata I.Williams
Acmadenia tetragona (L.f.) Bartl. & H.L.Wendl.
Acmadenia trigona (Eckl. & Zeyh.) Druce
Acmadenia wittebergensis (Compton) I.Williams

References 

Zanthoxyloideae genera
Flora of South Africa
Zanthoxyloideae